Battle of Pudeto was an attack by Chilean patriots forces During the 1826 campaign on the Spanish stronghold of Chiloé in southern Chile. After landing in the northern coast Chiloé Island Supreme Director Ramón Freire planned a direct assault led by Jorge Beauchef on enemy positions during the night. Manuel Blanco Encalada and José Manuel Borgoño successfully convinced Freire to instead attempt weaken the royalists and presented a plan to capture three small gunboats. Freire conceded and Guillermo Bell was chosen for the task. Bell was able to successfully capture the gunboats despite being next to the fort of San Carlos.

References

Puedeto
Pudeto
Pudeto
Pudeto
Pudeto
1826 in Chile
History of Chiloé
January 1826 events
Pudeto
Pudeto